Suwałki Governorate was a governorate (administrative area) of Congress Poland ("Russian Poland") which had its seat in the city of Suwałki. It covered a territory of about 12,300 km².

History

In 1867, the territories of the Augustów Governorate and the Płock Governorates were re-organised to form the Płock Governorate, the Suwałki Governorate (consisting mostly of the Augustów Governorate territories) and a recreated Łomża Governorate.

After World War I, the governorate was split between the Second Polish Republic and Lithuania, mostly along ethnic lines (with an exception of the area in the proximity of Puńsk and north of Sejny). The Polish part, known as Suwałki Region, was incorporated into the Białystok Voivodeship. The Lithuanian region of Suvalkija was named after the governorate.

Demographics and economy
According to contemporary Russian Empire statistics, from 1889 the Suwałki Governorate was predominantly Lithuanian since they comprised 57.8% of the population. Lithuanians formed a majority only in the northern part of the governorate in the counties of Kalvarija, Marijampolė, Naujamiestis, Vilkaviškis as well as the eastern part of the Sejny county. Poles were in a majority in the southern part of the governorate in the counties of Suwałki, Augustów and in the western part of the Sejny county.

Before World War I, the Suwałki Governorate was economically the least developed area of Congress Poland. It was characterised by the lowest agricultural productivity and profitability. In 1912, the governorate had a population density of just 45 persons per km2, compared to Congress' average of 103 persons per km2.

Administrative divisions
It was divided into seven counties:

References

 
Governorates of Congress Poland